Roanoke is a city in Randolph County, which is in the Piedmont region of eastern Alabama, United States. As of the 2020 census, the population of the city was 5,311, down from 6,074 in 2010 and 6,563 in 2000.

History
Roanoke was occupied by the Creek before treaties to persuade the Native Americans to cede their land, followed by forced migration under the Indian Removal Act of 1830. The area was part of a broad part of upland developed as cotton plantations worked by enslaved African Americans. The area is still quite rural.

Initially called High Pine in the 1830s after a nearby creek, it was allegedly burned during an Indian uprising in 1836. Renamed Chulafinee in 1840, it was later renamed again for the hometown of one of the early settlers, Roanoke, Virginia. The city was officially incorporated in December 1890.

Geography
Roanoke is located at  (33.148830, -85.369784).

The city is located in the southern part of Randolph County along U.S. Route 431, which is the main route through the city. U.S. 431 leads northwest 13 mi (21 km) to Wedowee, the Randolph County seat, and south 21 mi (34 km) to LaFayette. Alabama State Route 22 also runs through the city, leading west 13 mi (21 km) to Wadley and northeast 9 mi (14 km) to the Georgia state line.

Local
The Mayor has been Jill Patterson since 2021.

Roanoke has three schools served by Roanoke City Schools: Knight Enloe Elementary (K-3), Handley Middle School (4-8), and Handley High School (9-12). On December 1, 2011, the Handley Tigers won the AHSAA Football Class 3A State Championship.In 2016 and 2020 the Handley Tigers won the AHSAA 4A state title.

Roanoke is served by a weekly newspaper, The Randolph Leader.

Demographics

2000 census
At the 2000 census there were 6,563 people in 2,467 households, including 1,660 families, in the city. The racial makeup of the city was 58.94% White, 39.77% Black or African American, 0.06% Native American, 0.26% Asian, 0.34% from other races, and 0.64% from two or more races. 1.19% of the population were Hispanic or Latino of any race.
Of the 2,467 households 30.6% had children under the age of 18 living with them, 46.9% were married couples living together, 17.3% had a female householder with no husband present, and 32.7% were non-families. 30.2% of households were one person and 13.5% were one person aged 65 or older. The average household size was 2.51 and the average family size was 3.12.

The age distribution was 26.0% under the age of 18, 8.7% from 18 to 24, 25.3% from 25 to 44, 20.8% from 45 to 64, and 19.2% 65 or older. The median age was 37 years. For every 100 females, there were 86.8 males. For every 100 females age 18 and over, there were 79.4 males.

The median household income was $26,946 and the median family income  was $32,405. Males had a median income of $29,594 versus $22,135 for females. The per capita income for the city was $14,088. About 11.9% of families and 18.6% of the population were below 7% of those younger than 18 and 15.8% of those age 65 or older.

2010 census
At the 2010 census there were 6,074 people in 2,409 households, including 1,538 families, in the city. The racial makeup of the city was 57.6% White, 40.5% Black or African American, 0.2% Native American, 0.6% Asian, 0.2% from other races, and 0.9% from two or more races. 1.2% of the population were Hispanic or Latino of any race.
Of the 2,409 households 29.1% had children under the age of 18 living with them, 38.1% were married couples living together, 21.8% had a female householder with no husband present, and 36.2% were non-families. 33.1% of households were one person and 15.5% were one person aged 65 or older. The average household size was 2.45 and the average family size was 3.11.

The age distribution was 26.9% under the age of 18, 8.0% from 18 to 24, 23.5% from 25 to 44, 24.5% from 45 to 64, and 17.2% 65 or older. The median age was 37.8 years. For every 100 females, there were 80.0 males. For every 100 females age 18 and over, there were 83.4 males.

The median household income was $30,073 and the median family income  was $37,007. Males had a median income of $35,096 versus $31,406 for females. The per capita income for the city was $20,286. About 25.8% of families and 31.0% of the population were below 47.7% of those younger than 18 and 13.5% of those age 65 or older.

2020 census

As of the 2020 United States census, there were 5,311 people, 2,387 households, and 1,562 families residing in the city.

Notable people
Admiral Edward A. Burkhalter, Chief of Naval Intelligence; Director of Intelligence Community, CIA
Wilkie Clark, African-American entrepreneur and civil rights activist
Jake Daniel, former Major League Baseball player
George Eddy, American-French basketball commentator and professional basketball player
Horace Gillom, former Cleveland Browns football player, who contributed to the evolution of punting by standing farther back from the center than was normal at the time
William Anderson Handley, former congressman
Fred Hyatt, former Auburn University and professional football wide receiver
Odell McLeod, country-gospel singer, radio entertainer, and songwriter
Stanley O'Neal, former chairman and chief executive officer of Merrill Lynch
Clare Purcell, former bishop of the Methodist Episcopal Church, South, and the Methodist Church
Ella Gaunt Smith, doll manufacturer
David Vann, mayor of Birmingham, Alabama
Bradley Bozeman, former University of Alabama football player and current NFL football player with the Baltimore Ravens.
Henry Spec Bonner, former mayor of Roanoke and owner of the old Bonner hotel.
Ronald L Traylor, MVP 1961 1A Alabama State Basketball Tournament, 1A Alabama State Tournament Record Holder (1961 vs. Notasulga, 39 points).  University of Alabama sophomore redshirt, 1963.

References

External links
 "Roanoke, AL", Library of Congress

Cities in Alabama
Cities in Randolph County, Alabama